Cyperus constanzae is a species of sedge that is native to parts of the Caribbean.

See also 
 List of Cyperus species

References 

constanzae
Plants described in 1912
Taxa named by Ignatz Urban
Flora of the Bahamas
Flora of Cuba
Flora of the Dominican Republic
Flora of Haiti
Flora of Jamaica
Flora without expected TNC conservation status